Sint-Lodewijkscollege ("Saint Louis's college") may refer to:

 Sint-Lodewijkscollege (Lokeren), a Catholic high school in Belgium
 Sint-Lodewijkscollege (Bruges), a refuge for the Abbey of Saint Bertin